Hradetsky Hotel, is a 21-storey hotel in Chernihiv. It is one of the tallest buildings in the city.

Description
The largest hotel in the city. Located in a high-rise building, 10 minutes' walk from the center close to the main attraction of the city * Catherine's Church, Pyatnytska Church, Transfiguration Cathedral, Krasna Square, Shchors cinema and Dytynets Park. It is also located to 4 km to the Chernihiv–Ovruch railway and 140 km to Boryspil International Airport and Kyiv International Airport (Zhuliany) in Kyiv. Gradetsky restaurant is considered one of the best in the city. In the hotel there are "suites", 1-bed and 2-bed rooms.

History
The 22-storey building was built in 1980 and opened in 1981. KyivZDNIEP design organization.

Architects Valentyn Shtolko, Alla Grachova, Oleksandr Kabatsky, Volodymyr Ralchenko, design engineer Volodymyr Sloboda, and builder Ihor Lyubenko took an active part in the design and construction of the hotel. In 1984, they were awarded the Shevchenko Prize. Interiors and furniture were designed by architect IJ Karakis. In 1997, the hotel was partially renovated.

An advertisement for the sale of a hotel and office complex in the central part of Chernihiv worth UAH 25,000,000 appeared on the popular OLX sales site.24_big-570x3901-e1493131068125.

In 2018, the Gradetsky Hotel has new owners, including Oksana Golubova, head of the Chernihiv branch of the Solidarity V. Nalyvaichenko party, and Yuriy Tarasovets, a former city council deputy, banker and developer. of the current convocation of the city council, they want to restore the hotel and preserve its profile, "said Alexander Gaspar. It will be recalled that the initial value of the building put up for sale for debts by the seller - the State Executive Service - is over UAH 17 million, but two auctions could not determine the winner of the auction.

In 2020 "33by Architecture" has published the project of the SIVER residential complex, which is proposed to be built instead of the Hradetsky Hotel in Chernihiv. Designers showed Atroshenko's house in the center of Chernihiv. According to the project, it is proposed to build 4 residential buildings, a closed courtyard and parking. Three houses on 25 floors and one on 10-11 floors. As you know, 33by Architecture has designed a business center on Kyivska Street in Chernihiv and the house of Mayor Vladyslav Atroshenko, opposite Bohdan Khmelnytsky Park.

Services

Main Services
 suites
 single and double rooms
 bathroom
 shower
 TV
 refrigerator

Additional services
 pharmacy kiosk
 pets allowed
 taxi call
 cable TV
 ticket office (air, railway), 
 conference hall (seats 30)
 photocopier
 shops
 currency exchange
 disabled facilities
 national TV
 paid guarded parking
 beauty salon
 dental office
 fax
 dry cleaning
 Billiards
 bowling
 casino
 night club
 Restaurant "Gradetsky" (seats 250)

See also 

 List of hotels in Chernihiv

Gallery

References

External links

 —Official site

Hotels in Chernihiv
Hotels built in the Soviet Union
Hotel buildings completed in 1980
Hotels established in 1980